Manuela João Simão (born 4 April 2002), known as Nela, is an Angolan footballer who plays as a defender for GD Sagrada Esperança and the Angola women's national team.

Club career
Nela has played for Sagrada Esperança in Angola.

International career
Nela capped for Angola at senior level during the 2021 COSAFA Women's Championship.

References

2002 births
Living people
Angolan women's footballers
Women's association football defenders
G.D. Sagrada Esperança players
Angola women's international footballers